Dani Chambers (born July 23) is an American voice actress, known for her work on anime dubs for Funimation.

Biography
Chambers was born and raised into San Bernardino, California by Growing up, Chambers was a fan of Sailor Moon and Tenchi Muyo!, as well as voice actress Cree Summer. She also got into theater and acting from a young age. In 2013, Chambers started creating videos for YouTube, where she learned the basics of voice acting. In late 2016, she joined Funimation and was cast in her first role as Zanko Fujiwara in The Morose Mononokean.

Filmography

Anime series

Films

Video games

Web series

References

External links
 

21st-century American actresses
African-American actresses
American video game actresses
American voice actresses
Living people
Year of birth missing (living people)